Máire Geoghegan-Quinn (born 5 September 1950) is an Irish former Fianna Fáil politician who served as European Commissioner for Research, Innovation and Science from 2010 to 2014, Member of the European Court of Auditors from 2000 to 2010, Minister for Equality and Law Reform from November 1994 to December 1994, Minister for Justice from 1993 to 1994, Minister for Tourism, Transport and Communications from 1992 to 1993, Minister of State at the Department of the Taoiseach from 1987 to 1989, Minister of State for Youth and Sport from March 1982 to December 1982, Minister for the Gaeltacht from 1979 to 1981, Minister of State at the Department of Industry, Commerce and Energy from 1978 to 1979 and Parliamentary Secretary to the Minister for Industry and Commerce from 1977 to 1978. She served as a Teachta Dála (TD) for the Galway West constituency from 1975 to 1997.

Early and personal life
Máire Geoghegan was born in Carna, County Galway, in September 1950. She was educated at Coláiste Muire, Tourmakeady, in County Mayo and at Carysfort College in Blackrock, Dublin, from where she qualified as a teacher. She is married to John Quinn, with whom she has two children. Her novel The Green Diamond, about four young women sharing a house in Dublin in the 1960s, was published in 1996.

Geoghegan-Quinn was awarded an honorary doctorate of Laws (LLD) by NUI Galway in June 2014.

Political career

Her father, Johnny Geoghegan, was a Fianna Fáil TD for Galway West from 1954 until his death in 1975. His daughter successfully contested the subsequent by-election. From 1977 to 1979, she worked as Parliamentary Secretary (junior minister) at the Department of Industry, Commerce and Energy. She served as a member of Galway City Council from 1985 to 1991.

Geoghegan-Quinn supported Charles Haughey in the 1979 Fianna Fáil leadership election and was subsequently appointed to the cabinet post of Minister for the Gaeltacht. She became the first woman to hold an Irish cabinet post since Countess Markievicz had served as Minister for Labour from 1919 to 1921 in the Dáil Ministry during the First Dáil, and the first since the establishment of the Irish Free State in 1922.

In 1982, she was appointed Minister of State at the Department of Education. Her tenure was short because the 23rd Dáil lasted only 279 days, and a Fine Gael–Labour Party coalition was formed after the November 1982 general election. In opposition, she became Chair of the first Joint Committee on Women's Rights in 1983 and a member of the Joint Committee on Marriage Breakdown.

When Fianna Fáil returned to power after the 1987 general election, she became Minister of State at the Department of the Taoiseach. She had expected a senior government position, and was disappointed. She resigned in 1991, in opposition to Charles Haughey's leadership of the party. The following year Albert Reynolds, whom she now backed for the leadership, became Taoiseach and Fianna Fáil leader. For her loyalty to Reynolds, she was appointed Minister for Tourism, Transport and Communications. She became Minister for Justice in 1993, in which post she introduced substantial law reform legislation, including the decriminalisation of homosexuality; she was also briefly acting Minister for Equality and Law Reform in late 1994, following the resignation of Labour Party Minister Mervyn Taylor from Reynolds' coalition government.

When Reynolds resigned as leader of Fianna Fáil in November 1994, Geoghegan-Quinn was seen as his preferred successor in the position. In the resulting leadership election she stood against Bertie Ahern; a win would have made her the first female Taoiseach. On the day of the vote, however, she withdrew from the contest "in the interests of party unity". It was reported that she had the support of only 15 members of the 66-strong parliamentary party.

At the 1997 general election she retired from politics completely, citing privacy issues, after details about her 17-year-old son's expulsion from school appeared in the newspapers. "If his mother had been a homemaker, an architect or a businesswoman, this simply would not have happened" she commented. Other reports suggested that she saw her prospects for promotion under Ahern as poor, and a weak showing in constituency opinion polls indicated her seat could be in danger. She became a non-executive director of Aer Lingus, a member of the board of the Declan Ganley-owned Ganley Group, and wrote a column for The Irish Times.

Geoghegan-Quinn was appointed to the European Court of Auditors in 1999, replacing former Labour Party politician and Minister Barry Desmond. She was appointed for a second term at the Court of Auditors in March 2006, and resigned on 9 February 2010.

She was nominated by the Taoiseach Brian Cowen to become Ireland's European Commissioner in November 2009, and was subsequently allocated the Research, Innovation and Science portfolio.

In April 2010, after numerous calls were made over several days for Geoghegan-Quinn to surrender her pensions as an Irish former politician—which were worth over €104,000—while she remained in a paid public office, she did so.

In July 2015, it was announced that she would chair an independent panel to examine issues of gender equality among Irish higher education staff.

In March 2021, NUI Galway announced her appointment as chairperson of Údarás na hOllscoile, the University's Governing Authority, on a four-year term until 2025.

References

External links

1950 births
Living people
Alumni of Carysfort College
European Commissioners 2009–2014
Female justice ministers
Fianna Fáil TDs
Irish European Commissioners
Irish schoolteachers
Members of the 20th Dáil
Members of the 21st Dáil
Members of the 22nd Dáil
Members of the 23rd Dáil
Members of the 24th Dáil
Members of the 25th Dáil
Members of the 26th Dáil
Members of the 27th Dáil
20th-century women Teachtaí Dála
Ministers for Justice (Ireland)
Ministers for Transport (Ireland)
Ministers of State of the 21st Dáil
Ministers of State of the 23rd Dáil
Ministers of State of the 25th Dáil
Ministers of State of the 26th Dáil
Local councillors in Galway (city)
People associated with the University of Galway
Politicians from County Galway
Women European Commissioners
Women government ministers of the Republic of Ireland
Women ministers of state of the Republic of Ireland